The Roman Catholic Archdiocese of Vitória da Conquista is an archdiocese located in the city of Vitória da Conquista in Brazil.

History
 27 July 1957: Established as Diocese of Vitória da Conquista from the Diocese of Amargosa
 16 January 2002: Promoted as Metropolitan Archdiocese of Vitória da Conquista

Bishops
Bishops of Vitória da Conquista
Jackson Berenguer Prado (1958.04.16 – 1962.09.24)
Climério Almeida de Andrade (1962.09.24 – 1981.05.24)
Celso José Pinto da Silva (1981.07.04 – 2001.02.21), appointed Archbishop of Teresina, Piaui 
Archbishops of Vitória da Conquista
Geraldo Lyrio Rocha (2002.01.16 – 2007.04.11), appointed Archbishop of Mariana, Minas Gerais
Luís Gonzaga Silva Pepeu, O.F.M. Cap. (11 June 2008 - 9 October 2019)
Josafá Menezes da Silva (9 October 2019 – present)

Other priests of this diocese who became bishops
Zanoni Demettino Castro, appointed Bishop of São Mateus, Espirito Santo in 2007
Valdemir Ferreira dos Santos, appointed Bishop of Floriano, Piaui in 2010
João Santos Cardoso, appointed Bishop of São Raimundo Nonato, Piaui in 2011
Estevam dos Santos Silva Filho, appointed Auxiliary Bishop of São Salvador da Bahia in 2014
José Roberto Silva Carvalho, appointed Bishop of Caetité, Bahia n 2016

Suffragan dioceses
 Diocese of Bom Jesus da Lapa 
 Diocese of Caetité
 Diocese of Jequié
 Diocese of Livramento de Nossa Senhora

Sources
 GCatholic.org
 Catholic Hierarchy
  Archdiocese website (Portuguese) 

Roman Catholic dioceses in Brazil
Roman Catholic ecclesiastical provinces in Brazil
 
Christian organizations established in 1957
Roman Catholic dioceses and prelatures established in the 20th century